Christian Bernard (born 30 November 1951), F.R.C., is a former Imperator of AMORC, a mystical Rosicrucian order. He became Imperator on 12 April 1990. On October 3, 2018, Bernard announced his resignation as Imperator, and the election of Claudio Mazzucco as AMORC's new Imperator.

Personal life 
According to the AMORC digest (publications given by the AMORC organization to its members periodically). He became a Rosicrucian at the age of 15. 

Christian Bernard and his wife Helene have three children. The family is dedicated to the esoteric duties of AMORC.

Notable works  
Books Written

 "So Mote It Be" (1995) 

 "Questions And Answers" (2001) 

 "Rosicrucian Reflections" (2012)

References

External links
 Biography from AMORC USA 
 The Spiritualization and Humanization of the World

1951 births
Living people
Rosicrucians